Anxiety is an emotion characterized by an unpleasant state of inner turmoil.

Anxiety or anxious may also refer to:

Film and television
 Anxiety (1953 film), a Mexican musical drama
 Anxiety (1998 film), a Portuguese film
 "Anxiety", an episode of Quarterlife
 "Anxiety", an episode of One Day at a Time (2017 TV series)

Music
 Anxious Records, a record label founded by Dave Stewart of Eurythmics

Albums
 Anxiety (Ladyhawke album) or the title song, 2012
 Anxiety (Smile Empty Soul album), 2005
 The Anxiety (album), a 2020 album by The Anxiety (Willow Smith and Tyler Cole)

Songs
 "Anxiety" (Julia Michaels song), 2019
 "Anxiety" (Megan Thee Stallion song), 2022
 "Anxiety", a song by Bad Religion from the album No Control, 1989
 "Anxiety", a song by Billy Cobham from the album Spectrum, 1973
 "Anxiety", a song by Blackbear from the mixtape Cybersex, 2017
 "Anxiety", a song by Black Eyed Peas featuring Papa Roach from the album Elephunk, 2003
 "Anxiety", a song by Coi Leray from the album Trendsetter, 2022
 "Anxiety", a song by Jason Isbell and the 400 Unit from the album The Nashville Sound, 2017
 "Anxiety", a song by Juice Wrld from the album Legends Never Die, 2020
 "Anxiety", a song by Ramones from the album Mondo Bizarro, 1992
 "Anxiety", a song by Simple Plan from the album Harder Than It Looks, 2022

Places
 Anxiety Point, Alaska, US
 Anxious Bay, South Australia, Australia

Other uses
 Anxiety (journal), a monthly medical journal, merged into Depression and Anxiety
 Anxiety (Munch), an 1894 painting by Edvard Munch
 Anxiety UK, formerly the National Phobics Society, a British charity

See also
 Anxiety disorder, a psychiatric disorder characterized by excessive rumination and worrying
 Anxiety sensitivity, a fear of behaviors or sensations associated with the experience of anxiety
 Anxiety threshold, the level of anxiety that will affect a person's performance
 The Concept of Anxiety, an 1844 book by Søren Kierkegaard